War Baron was a steam cargo ship built in 1916-1917 by Northwest Steel Company of Portland for Lauritz Kloster of Stavanger. The vessel was launched as Vesterlide but was renamed early in 1917 after the Cunard Line bought the vessel from their Norwegian owners. The freighter was torpedoed and sunk in January 1918 with a loss of two men.

Design and construction
In late 1915 Lauritz Kloster of Stavanger, who at the time was operating four small vessels in the Baltic, decided to expand their operations into trans-Atlantic trade. In February 1916 a contract was prepared between the Norwegian firm, A/S Klosters Rederi, on one side and Northwest Steel Co. and Willamette Iron & Steel Works on the other, to build two vessels of approximately 8,800 deadweight, and signed in early April of the same year.
Vesterlide was laid down on 27 July 1916 at the Northwest Steel newly built shipyard on the south side of Portland, and launched on 31 March 1917 (yard number 1), with Miss Marion Virginia Bowles, daughter of J. R. Bowles, the president of Northwest Steel Co., being the sponsor. As the ship was the first steel freighter to be built in Portland, the launching ceremony was open to the public, and was attended by a large number of common folk as well as local dignitaries. As Vesterlide was launched, two hawsers holding her bow failed and the freighter lunged into water travelling approximately half a mile across the Willamette River and smashing into sternwheeler  hitting her amidships and opening a wide hole in her. Three people on board the wheeler were injured as they jumped over board. Ruth sank after approximately 45 minutes, but was later raised, repaired and returned to service.

The ship was a two-deck three-island steamer with machinery amidships, and was equipped with all the modern machinery for quick loading and unloading of cargo from four main and one small hatches. The vessel also had electrical lights installed along the decks.

While the vessels were still under construction, A/S Klosters Rederi made a decision to divest of two of them due to delays in delivery and uncertainties related to ongoing World War I. As British were attempting to replenish huge losses suffered by their Merchant marine during the course of the war, the Norwegians were eventually approached by the Cunard Line. On 26 February 1917 Vesterlide and her sister ship Vesterlen, also being built by Northwest Steel, were sold for approximately 4,300,000. On 10 April 1917 it was announced that all new Cunard vessel names would be prefixed by the word "War" and Vesterlide was officially rechristened War Baron.

Initially, the freighter was slated to leave for her trials on 5 July but due to the need to erect a gun platform her departure was delayed until 9 July, when War Baron left the shipyard for Tacoma. After successful completion of sea trials War Baron returned to Tacoma to load cargo and was handed over to the Cunard Line officials on 14 July.

The steam for the engine was supplied by three single-ended Scotch marine boilers fitted for both coal and oil fuel.

Operational history
While still under construction the vessel was inspected by the 13th Naval District on 29 June 1917 and assigned the Navy ID # 1641. She was not taken over for U.S. Navy service and remained under British control until the end of her career. Following delivery to Cunard Line the ship loaded cargo of lumber and general merchandise at various ports of the Pacific Northwest and departed Port Townsend on 3 August 1917 to Esquimalt. There she was to receive her sealed orders, which her captain had to open when the vessel was past Cape Flattery. She eventually arrived in England at the end of October 1917 via San Pedro and the Panama Canal. Upon arrival in England War Baron was taken over by the Shipping Controller with intention of being used to transport ammunition and provisions and was armed.

The vessel remained in Southampton until early January 1918. On 5 January 1918 War Baron was on a passage from Southampton to Barry for coaling. An explosion ripped a huge hole in the steamer's hull, and she began quickly to fill up. Lifeboats were launched and all but two seamen aboard the freighter were able to abandon the sinking ship either in lifeboats or by jumping overboard. As the attack took place so close to the shore, the whole incident was witnessed and wireless call for help was immediately dispatched. Several Navy vessels arrived a couple of hours later and all survivors were soon safely landed ashore.

Notes 

1917 ships
Ships built in Portland, Oregon
Merchant ships of the United Kingdom
Ships sunk by German submarines in World War I
Shipwrecks of England
Maritime incidents in 1918